Mohamad Ahmad Fares (born 21 January 1990 in Aleppo, Syria) is a Syrian footballer. He currently plays for Al-Najma, which competes in the Bahraini Premier League the top division in Bahrain. He plays as a midfielder, wearing the number 7 jersey for Al-Ittihad. A product of Al-Ittihad's youth system, he made his first-team breakthrough under manager Valeriu Tița during the 2008–09 season.

He helped Al-Ittihad reach the final of the AFC Cup the second most important association cup in Asia. Al-Ittihad won the final against Kuwaiti Premier League champions Al-Qadsia after penalties. The game was tied 1–1 after regular time and Extra Time.

Honour and Titles

Club 
Al-Ittihad
 Syrian Cup: 2011
 AFC Cup: 2010

References 

1990 births
Living people
Sportspeople from Aleppo
Syrian footballers
Syria international footballers
Syrian expatriate footballers
Expatriate footballers in Bahrain
Syrian expatriate sportspeople in Bahrain
Expatriate footballers in Iraq
Syrian expatriate sportspeople in Iraq
Association football midfielders
Al-Ittihad Aleppo players
AFC Cup winning players
Syrian Premier League players